The 2021 Argentina rugby union tours of Europe were two tours by the Argentina national team on Europe that included a series of matches played in the continent. The first tour was in July, 2021, and was composed of three matches in Romania and Wales, as preparation for the 2021 Rugby Championship. Argentina played one match v Romania and two v Wales national teams.

The second tour started in November, 2021, after the Pumas concluded their participation in the Rugby Championship with no successful results (having lost the six matches played). The squad visited France, Italy, and Ireland to play a series of test matches in those countries. The tests v France and Italy had been scheduled for July 2020 but were postponed due to the COVID-19 pandemic.

Touring party 
Players that were called up for both tours, were: Matías Alemanno, Gonzalo Bertranou, Emiliano Boffelli, Facundo Bosch, Rodrigo Bruni, Santiago Carreras, Santiago Chocobares, Santiago Cordero, Tomás Cubelli, Jerónimo De la Fuente, Bautista Delguy, Felipe Ezcurra, Facundo Gigena, Francisco Gorrisen, Francisco Gómez Kodela, Juan Imhoff, Facundo Isa, Marcos Kremer, Tomás Lavanini, Tomás Lezana, Pablo Matera, Santiago Medrano, Domingo Miotti, Julián Montoya (captain), Matías Moroni, Matías Orlando, Guido Petti, Enrique Pieretto, Nicolás Sánchez, Santiago Socino, Nahuel Tetaz Chaparro, and Federico Wgrzyn.

For the tour of November, Santiago Grondona, Tomás Cubelli and Facundo Isa returned to the team, apart from the addition of youth players Facundo Cordero and Ignacio Ruiz, which made their debuts with Los Pumas. Players selected that were not part of the first tour were Eduardo Bello, Mateo Carreras, Lucio Cinti, Facundo Cordero, Thomas Gallo, Gonzalo García, Juan Martín González, Santiago Grondona, Juan Cruz Mallía, Lucas Mensa, and Ignacio Ruiz.

On the other hand, Agustín Creevy, Juan Imhoff, and Benjamín Urdapilleta were left behind for the tour.

First tour

Match summary

Match details

Second tour

Match summary

Match details

References 

Argentina national rugby union team tours
t
t
t
t
t
Rugby union tours of Romania
Rugby union tours of Wales
Rugby union tours of France
Rugby union tours of Italy
Rugby union tours of Ireland